Hans-Hubert "Berti" Vogts (born 30 December 1946) is a German former professional footballer who played as a defender. He played for Borussia Mönchengladbach in the Bundesliga his whole professional club career and won the FIFA World Cup with West Germany in 1974. He later managed the national teams of Germany (winning Euro 96), Scotland, Nigeria and Azerbaijan.

Club career
Vogts joined the boys' football team of local sports club VfR Büttgen in 1954, at the age of seven, staying with them until his transfer in 1965 to Borussia Mönchengladbach. A right back, his tenacity earned him the nickname "Der Terrier".

He was one of the key players, along with Rainer Bonhof, Herbert Wimmer, Uli Stielike, Allan Simonsen and Jupp Heynckes, during Borussia's golden years in the 1970s, when it won the Bundesliga five times, the German Cup once, and the UEFA Cup twice. Vogts also played in the 1977 European Cup Final defeat by Liverpool.

Vogts made 419 Bundesliga appearances for Mönchengladbach, scoring 32 times, and also appeared 64 times for the club in European competition, scoring eight goals. Vogts remained with Mönchengladbach, until he retired from playing in 1979.

International career

Vogts played nine international boys' games for West Germany, made three appearances for the under 23s team, and has 96 senior caps, making him one of Germany's most capped players. He was captain for twenty of the senior games, scored one international goal and was also a member of the German national team that won the 1974 World Cup.

Nicknamed "Der Terrier" for always fighting for every ball as if it were his last, Vogts was a big favourite with his home crowd. Vogts famously marked, and subdued, Johan Cruyff, in the final of the 1974 World Cup in Munich, West Germany, won by West Germany 2–1.

During the match between West Germany and Austria on 21 June 1978, in the second round of the 1978 FIFA World Cup, he scored an own goal, allowing Austria to beat West Germany for the first time in 47 years, and preventing West Germany from moving on to the next round. In Austria, this match is fondly known as the Miracle of Córdoba.

Managerial career

West Germany and Germany
After his playing career ended, Vogts became coach of the West Germany under 21 national team, and continued in that role until 1990. Starting in 1986, he became an assistant manager of the senior national side. He was promoted to manager of Germany in August 1990, succeeding Franz Beckenbauer.

After winning the 1990 FIFA World Cup Final the month before, Beckenbauer famously said that the reunified Germany will "probably be unbeatable for years", a statement which turned out to be a burden for Vogts during the upcoming years. Although Vogts led the German national team to a Euro 1992 runner up finish and winning the next Euros in 1996, two World Cup quarter-final defeats in 1994 and 1998 are also on his sheet. He stepped down as manager in September 1998.

Bayer Leverkusen
In November 2000, after some time out of managing, he was appointed manager of Bayer Leverkusen. The following May, despite earning Bayer Leverkusen qualification for the Champions League, he was sacked.

Kuwait
Three months later, in August 2001, he became manager of the Kuwait national team.

Scotland
Vogts resigned his position with Kuwait in January 2002, after six months in the post, to assume a similar position with the Scotland national team. In qualifying for UEFA Euro 2004, Vogts took Scotland to a play off place, finishing second in their group to Germany. In the playoffs, Scotland were drawn against the Netherlands and Vogts led them to a 1–0 victory at Hampden Park, but the Netherlands beat Scotland 6–0 in the return leg.

The Scottish press became notably more hostile towards Vogts following a series of defeats in friendly matches. A 1–1 draw with Moldova in October 2004 essentially put paid to Scotland's hopes of qualifying for the 2006 World Cup. Vogts resigned on 1 November, with a year and a half remaining on his contract, citing "disgraceful abuse". Nine days after Vogts resigned, Scotland dropped to a record low of 77th place in the FIFA World Rankings.

Nigeria
In January 2007, Vogts was appointed manager of Nigeria, and signed a four-year contract. Nigeria were eliminated in the quarter finals of the 2008 African Nations Cup, which was their worst performance in the competition since 1982. Vogts resigned from his position in February 2008.

Azerbaijan

In April 2008, he was appointed manager of Azerbaijan, on a two-year contract. In December 2009, he extended his contract with AFFA until the end of qualifying for UEFA Euro 2012, after successful results. In March 2014, Vogts was appointed by Jürgen Klinsmann as a special advisor to the United States, for the 2014 World Cup.

In October 2014, he resigned from his position as Azerbaijan manager, after a 6–0 defeat against Croatia. Azerbaijan had lost all of their first three matches in UEFA Euro 2016 qualifying Group H. Under Vogts, Azerbaijan had some poor results, not being able to win against second string sides, forcing Vogts to face major criticism from local supporters and the media.

United States
In March 2015, Vogts was appointed by the United States national team as a technical advisor. After the dismissal of Jürgen Klinsmann, Vogts' employment also ended.

Career statistics

Club

Managerial statistics

Honours

Player
Borussia Mönchengladbach
Bundesliga: 1969–70, 1970–71, 1974–75, 1975–76, 1976–77
DFB-Pokal: 1972–73
UEFA Cup: 1974–75, 1978–79

West Germany
FIFA World Cup: 1974
UEFA European Championship: 1972

Individual
kicker Bundesliga Team of the Season: 1965–66, 1967–68, 1968–69, 1969–70, 1970–71, 1972–73, 1974–75, 1975–76, 1976–77
Footballer of the Year (Germany): 1971, 1979
FIFA World Cup All-Star Team: 1974, 1978

Manager
Germany
UEFA European Championship: 1996

Individual
World Soccer Magazine World Manager of the Year: 1996

References

External links

Leverkusen who's who
Planetworldcup's biography of Berti Vogts
Hans Hubert Vogts – International Appearances

1946 births
Living people
People from Kaarst
Sportspeople from Düsseldorf (region)
Footballers from North Rhine-Westphalia
West German footballers
German footballers
Association football defenders
Borussia Mönchengladbach players
Bundesliga players
UEFA Cup winning players
Germany international footballers
1970 FIFA World Cup players
UEFA Euro 1972 players
1974 FIFA World Cup players
UEFA Euro 1976 players
1978 FIFA World Cup players
FIFA World Cup-winning players
UEFA European Championship-winning players
German football managers
Germany national under-21 football team managers
Germany national football team managers
Bayer 04 Leverkusen managers
Kuwait national football team managers
Scotland national football team managers
Nigeria national football team managers
Azerbaijan national football team managers
UEFA Euro 1992 managers
1994 FIFA World Cup managers
UEFA Euro 1996 managers
1998 FIFA World Cup managers
2008 Africa Cup of Nations managers
UEFA European Championship-winning managers
German expatriate football managers
German expatriate sportspeople in Kuwait
German expatriate sportspeople in Scotland
German expatriate sportspeople in Nigeria
German expatriate sportspeople in Azerbaijan
German expatriate sportspeople in the United States
Expatriate football managers in Kuwait
Expatriate football managers in Scotland
Expatriate football managers in Nigeria
Expatriate football managers in Azerbaijan
Officers Crosses of the Order of Merit of the Federal Republic of Germany